Ninagagi is a 2002 Indian Kannada language romantic musical film directed by S. Mahendar. The film stars Vijay Raghavendra in his first role as an adult and newcomer Radhika. The film is about a special friendship between a boy and girl. The film is a remake of the Malayalam film Niram (1999). The film was produced by Ramoji Rao and the music was composed by Gurukiran.

The film upon release met with very good positive response at the box office. It was one of the highest-grossing films of the year 2002.

Cast 

 Vijay Raghavendra as Tarun
 Radhika as Madhu
 Bhavana as special appearance in the song "Tin Tin"
 Ramakrishna as PWD contractor Raghavendra, Madhu's Father
 Tara as Rukkamma, cook in Tarun's House
 Avinash as Dr. Subramanya, Tarun's father
 Chitra Shenoy as Dr. Usha, Tarun's Mother
 Vishal Hegde as Prakash
 Shilpa as Varsha 
 Vidya Murthy as Madhu's Mother
 Nagashekhar as Sunil
 Sanketh Kashi as SK, a mental & silly lecturer
 Sihi Kahi Chandru as College Principal 
 Prashanth as Praveen 
 Bharath Bhagavathar 
 Ashalatha
 Hemashree as Kamala
 Dileep Kar 
 Shankar Bhat

Soundtrack 
All the songs were composed and scored by Gurukiran. Almost all the songs were recomposed with the same tunes as in the original film.

References

External links 
On my pinboard - Vijay Raghavendra Deccan Herald

2002 films
2000s Kannada-language films
Indian romantic drama films
Indian coming-of-age drama films
Kannada remakes of Malayalam films
Films scored by Gurukiran
Films directed by S. Mahendar
2000s coming-of-age drama films
2002 romantic drama films